Yahiaoui is a surname. Notable people with the surname include:

Abdel Manaane Yahiaoui (born 1966), Algerian weightlifter
Ahmed Yahiaoui (born 1987), French footballer of Algerian origin
Faten Yahiaoui (born 1985), Tunisian handball player
Hakim Yahiaoui, Algerian athlete